Stanley M. "Stan" Makowski (April 22, 1923 – August 5, 1981) was Mayor of the City of Buffalo, New York, serving 1974–1977.

Early life 
He was born in Buffalo on April 22, 1923, as the younger of two children of Polish immigrants. He dropped out of Hutchinson Central High School and served six months with the Civilian Conservation Corps. In 1943, he joined the Army and served three years during World War II, including an eight-month tour on Iwo Jima. After the war, he earned his high school diploma and attended Cornell University, where he received a certificate from the New York State School of Industrial and Labor Relations, and night school at Millard Fillmore College at the University of Buffalo.

Career 
In 1959, he accepted appointment to the at-large seat on the Common Council, when Thaddeus J. Dulski was elected to Congress. In 1969, Makowski ran as the Democratic candidate for Erie County executive; he was defeated in the general election by B. John Tutuska. In 1972, the Common Council created the post of deputy mayor and Makowski was the first appointed, serving under Mayor Frank A. Sedita. Upon Mayor Sedita's resignation of March 5, 1973, Makowski became mayor. He was elected as mayor on November 6, 1973. During his term, the Buffalo Convention Center was constructed, as was the Marine Midland Center. On January 28, 1977, a most disastrous blizzard struck Buffalo and Western New York. He served just one term as mayor (in addition to the final 10 months of Mayor Sedita's 3rd term).

Personal life 
He married Florence Ziolo on August 7, 1954. He died on August 5, 1981 and was buried in St. Stanislaus Cemetery in Cheektowaga, New York.

References

1923 births
1981 deaths
Military personnel from Buffalo, New York
Mayors of Buffalo, New York
American politicians of Polish descent
Civilian Conservation Corps people
Cornell University School of Industrial and Labor Relations alumni
New York (state) Democrats
20th-century American politicians
Buffalo Common Council members
United States Army personnel of World War II